Gábor Kis (born 27 September 1982 in Budapest) is a Hungarian water polo player. He was a member of the Gold medal winning Hungary men's national water polo team at the 2008 Beijing Olympics.

Honours

National
 Olympic Games:  Gold medal - 2008
 World Championships:  Silver medal - 2007
 European Championship:  Silver medal - 2006;  Bronze medal - 2008, 2016
 FINA World League:  Silver medal - 2007
 FINA World Cup:  Silver medal - 2006

145 present in the national team of Hungary.
 Junior World Championships: (Bronze medal - 2001)
 Youth European Championship: (Bronze medal - 1999)

Club
 Champions League Winners (1): (2017 - with Szolnok)

 Hungarian Championship (OB I): 6x (2009, 2010 - with Vasas; 2011 - with Eger; 2015, 2016, 2017 - with Szolnok)
 Hungarian Cup (Magyar Kupa): 4x (2007 - with Eger; 2009 - with Vasas; 2014, 2016 - with Szolnok)

Awards
 Szalay Iván-díj (2000)
 MVP in Hungarian SuperCup: (2001)
 Best Eger Player of the Year - UPC Award: (2005)

Orders
   Officer's Cross of the Order of Merit of the Republic of Hungary (2008)

See also
 Hungary men's Olympic water polo team records and statistics
 List of Olympic champions in men's water polo
 List of Olympic medalists in water polo (men)
 List of World Aquatics Championships medalists in water polo

References

External links
 

1982 births
Living people
Water polo players from Budapest
Hungarian male water polo players
Water polo centre forwards
Water polo players at the 2008 Summer Olympics
Water polo players at the 2016 Summer Olympics
Medalists at the 2008 Summer Olympics
Olympic gold medalists for Hungary in water polo
World Aquatics Championships medalists in water polo
20th-century Hungarian people
21st-century Hungarian people